Zameer Zahir (born 22 October 1973) was a Sri Lankan born cricketer who played international cricket for Canada. He played a single ODI for Canada in 2009. He also played First-class cricket for Colombo Cricket Club.

References

External links
 ESPNcricinfo

1973 births
Canadian cricketers
Sri Lankan cricketers
Living people
Canada One Day International cricketers
Colombo Cricket Club cricketers